The list of shipwrecks in May 1832 includes ships sunk, foundered, grounded, or otherwise lost during May 1832.

1 May

2 May

4 May

5 May

6 May

7 May

8 May

9 May

10 May

12 May

15 May

16 May

20 May

21 May

27 May

Unknown date

References

1832-05